Spitfire Lake is a part of the St. Regis River in the Adirondacks in northern New York State and is  in area.  Along with Upper and Lower St. Regis Lake, it became famous in the late 19th century as a summer playground of America's power elite, drawn to the area by its scenic beauty and by the rustic charms of Paul Smith's Hotel.  It is the site of many grand old summer "cottages" and Great Camps; Frederick W. Vanderbilt, Anson Phelps Stokes and Whitelaw Reid were among the summer residents.  "The camps of many of these families began as tent colonies, with separate units for sleeping, dining, games, and so on, and evolved into permanent structures built with understated taste."

Spitfire is part of the original Seven Carries canoe route from Paul Smith's Hotel to Saranac Inn.

Notes

Sources
Donaldson, Alfred L., A History of the Adirondacks.  New York: Century, 1921.  . (reprint)
Jerome, Christine Adirondack Passage: Cruise of Canoe Sairy Gamp, HarperCollins, 1994.  .

External links
New York Times, "Point Racing at Paul Smiths", August 9, 1909. (pdf)
New York Times, "Yacht Racing on St. Regis Lake", August 7, 1904. (pdf)
New York Times, "Mr. J. Pierpont Morgan to be Guest of Ambassador Reid at Dinner in Honor of Birthday of D.O. Mills", September 5, 1909. (PDF)

Adirondacks
Lakes of Franklin County, New York
Lakes of New York (state)
Paul Smiths, New York